Nurul Kabir is a Bangladeshi journalist, writer, columnist, editor, and activist. He is the editor of the outspoken Bangladeshi newspaper, New Age and  the editor of the Bengali weekly Budhbar. Nairbachanik Swairatantra O Ganatantrer Sangram and The Red Moulana are two of his most well-known books.

Education
Nurul Kabir received a Bachelor of Law degree from the University of Dhaka in 1983, and a Master of Arts degree in English from the same university in 1984. Also, Kabir studied advanced journalism at the Thompson Foundation in the UK in 1988, and was awarded the Jefferson fellowship for studying journalism at the East-West Center, the University of Hawaii at Manoa, Hawaii, the US, in 2004.

Activism
During his student life at Dhaka University, Kabir was a left-wing student leader and activist, who played an active role in forming the Students Committee of Action for Democracy in 1983; the Committee played a decisive role in fighting against the martial law regime during the eighties.

Journalism
Kabir is the editor of the New Age, the most outspoken newspaper in Bangladesh, highly regarded for its anti-establishment editorial policy. He was also the editor of the Bengali weekly Budhbar. Known for his upright journalism and bold political views, Kabir wrote many books, published numerous essays at both home and abroad, and presented many papers at regional, national, and international conferences.

Because of his opposition to the military regime of Bangladesh and his defence of media freedom, Kabir has been attacked on several occasions. In 2007/8 he had both his legs broken and was chased by gunmen on motorbikes.

Selected publications
 The Red Moulana (2012)
 Nairbachanik Swairatantra O Ganatantrer Sangram (2012)
 Kathokota (a collection of interviews) (2014)
Disposing of a Dictator: Revisiting a Magnificent Mass Uprising after 50 Years (2020)

References

Bangladeshi male writers
Bangladeshi journalists
Bangladeshi Marxists
University of Dhaka alumni
Living people
Bangladeshi editors
Year of birth missing (living people)